The 1964 Cincinnati Bearcats football team represented the University of Cincinnati in the Missouri Valley Conference (MVC) during the 1964 NCAA University Division football season. In their fourth season under head coach Chuck Studley, the Bearcats compiled an 8–2 record (3–0 against conference opponents), won the MVC championship, and outscored opponents by a total of 211 to 99.

The team's statistical leaders included team captain Brig Owens with 790 passing yards, Al Nelson with 973 rushing yards and 78 points scored, and Errol Prisby with 367 receiving yards. Nelson broke the Cincinnati single-season rushing record of 959 yards set by Roger Stephens in 1947.

Schedule

References

Cincinnati
Cincinnati Bearcats football seasons
Missouri Valley Conference football champion seasons
Cincinnati Bearcats football